Hayashi is a Japanese surname.

Hayashi may also refer to:

Hayashi clan (Owari) of Owari Province (a branch of the Inaba clan)
Hayashi clan (Confucian scholars) of Confucian scholars (founded by Hayashi Razan, came to prominence in the early Edo period, scholarly advisors to Tokugawa Ieyasu)
Hayashi clan (Jōzai) of the Jōzai Domain (descended from the Ogasawara clan)
Hayashi house, the name of one of the four Go houses in the Edo period
Hayashi (music), the term for a musical accompanist section, usually consisting primarily of percussion, in traditional Japanese theatre and dance.
4771 Hayashi, a main-belt asteroid

See also
Hayashi rice, a dish consisting of stewed beef and onions in gravy